Michael Alphonsus 'Alf' Hayes (29 July 1900 – 22 July 1976) was an Australian rules footballer who played with Fitzroy in the Victorian Football League (VFL).		

He was the brother of John Hayes who played a single game with Fitzroy the following season.

Notes

External links 

1900 births
Fitzroy Football Club players
Australian rules footballers from Victoria (Australia)
1976 deaths